The United States National Geodetic Survey lists 28 volcanic craters in the state of Arizona.

Coconino County

Black Bottom Crater
Campbell Crater
Colton Crater
Double Crater is an extinct Pleistocene volcano within the San Francisco volcanic field, north of Flagstaff.
Francis Crater
Haywire Crater
Junction Crater
Lenox Crater
Maroon Crater
Merriam Crater
Moon Crater
North Sheba Crater
O'Neill Crater
Old Caves Crater
Pinnacle Crater
Rattlesnake Crater
Robinson Crater was named for Henry H. Robinson, a United States Geological Survey researcher.
Roden Crater is an extinct volcano crater, and a project of artist James Turrell.
Saddle Crater
South Sheba Crater
Stewart Crater
Strawberry Crater
Sunset Crater is a cinder cone volcano in the San Francisco volcanic field, and a part of the Sunset Crater National Monument.
The Sproul

Cochise County
Paramore Crater

Greenlee County
Mumphry's Peak
Located just northeast of the town of Clifton, Arizona, this dormant cinder cone volcano and crater is easily visible from the town and In the satellite view of Google Maps.  The area is still geologically active, with several hot springs in the area.

See also

References

Arizona
Volcanic craters